The Asian Cricket Council also known as ACC is a cricket organisation which was established in 1983, to promote and develop the sport of cricket in Asia. Subordinate to the International Cricket Council, the council is the continent's regional administrative body, and currently consists of 25 member associations. Jay Shah is the current president of Asian Cricket Council.

History
The council was formed as the Asian Cricket Conference in New Delhi, India, on 19 September 1983, with the original members being Bangladesh, India, Malaysia, Pakistan, Singapore, and Sri Lanka. Changing its name to the present in 1995. Until 2003, the headquarters of the council were rotated biennially amongst the presidents' and secretaries' home countries. The organisation's current president is Jay Shah, who is also the Secretary of the BCCI.

The council runs a development program that supports coaching, umpiring and sports medicine programs in member countries, funded from television revenues collected during the officially sanctioned Asian Cricket Council tournaments including the Asia Cup ,Under-19 Asia Cup , Women's Asia Cup and various other tournaments.

The current ACC headquartered in Colombo, Sri Lanka, which was officially opened on 20 August 2016.

Members
ACC member associations are divided into two categories: full and associate members . Full members of the ICC are accorded "Full Member Status", whilst associate members of the ICC and ICC non-members (Taiwan as of 2023) are accorded "Associate Member Status". Fiji, Japan, and Papua New Guinea were formerly members of the ACC, but joined the East Asia–Pacific regional council when it was established in 1996.

Full members in the Asian Cricket Council

Associate Members in the Asian Cricket Council

Note 

 Mongolia and Uzbekistan have become Associate Members of the ICC but have yet to join any regional body, including the ACC, which is typical for Asian countries.

Non-ICC members in the Asian Cricket Council

Former members of the Asian Cricket Council

Map

Officials

Executive Board members

ACC Executive Committee

Development team

Development Committee

Resource staff (Umpiring)
 Bomi Jamula– 
 Peter Manuel – 
 Mahboob Shah –

Past presidents

ACC Events
 Asia Cup
 Women's Asia Cup
 Under-19 Asia Cup
 ACC Premier Cup
 ACC Challenger Cup
 ACC Emerging Teams Asia Cup
Current Title Holders

Defunct Tournaments 

 Afro-Asia Cup  
 ACC Championship
 Asian Test Championship
 ACC Premier League
 ACC Trophy
 ACC Twenty20 Cup
 ACC Eastern Region T20
 ACC Western Region T20

References

External links

Cricket administration
Cricket in Asia
Sports governing bodies in Asia
Sports organizations established in 1983